Major-General Sir (William) James Norman Cooke-Collis,  (7 May 1876 – 14 April 1941) was General Officer Commanding Northern Ireland District.

Military career
Cooke-Collis was born on 7 May 1876 in Castle Cooke, Kilworth, Co. Cork to Lt.-Colonel William Cooke-Collis and Catherine Maria Cooke-Collis (née Oliphant) and was educated at Cheltenham College. He was first commissioned into a militia battalion of the King's Royal Rifle Corps, transferring to the regular army with appointment as second lieutenant in the Royal Irish Rifles (later the Royal Ulster Rifles) on 24 February 1900. He served with Mounted infantry in the Second Boer War from 1900 to 1902, and was wounded in the attack on Dewetsdorp in November 1900. For his service in the war, he was mentioned in despatches and received the Queen's South Africa Medal with three clasps. Following the end of the war in June 1902, he left South Africa on the SS Kinfauns Castle in October 1902. He was promoted to lieutenant on 10 December 1902.

He later served in the First World War. After the War he was appointed Military Governor at Batoum (present-day Batumi) in Transcaucasia. He became Commander of 11th Infantry Brigade in 1927 and Commander of 55th (West Lancashire) Division in 1934. He was appointed General Officer Commanding Northern Ireland District in 1935. He was responsible for ensuring that the Royal Ulster Rifles had its depot in Ballymena, its own recruiting ground, rather than in Belfast. He was invested as a Knight Commander, Order of the British Empire in 1937. He retired in 1938 and died on 14 April 1941, aged 64.

Family
He married Cléonice Gamble, daughter of Major George Francis Gamble on 30 January 1906.

References

|-

1876 births
1941 deaths
Knights Commander of the Order of the British Empire
Companions of the Order of the Bath
Companions of the Order of St Michael and St George
Companions of the Distinguished Service Order
King's Royal Rifle Corps officers
Royal Ulster Rifles officers
British Army major generals
British Army personnel of World War I
Military personnel from County Cork